Nothing and Nowhere is the first studio album by the Canadian band The Birthday Massacre, released on July 23, 2002. The album was re-released in 2004 with new artwork due to high demand. Original pressings of the release sell for high prices to collectors on eBay. Reworked and re-recorded tracks of "Happy Birthday", "Horror Show", "Video Kid" and "The Dream" appear on their 2004 album, Violet, but only the LP version.

A reworked and re-recorded version of "To Die For" later appeared on the band's 2007 album, Walking with Strangers.

Track listing

Credits
Chibi - vocals
Rainbow - rhythm guitar, programming
Michael Falcore - lead guitar
J. Aslan - bass guitar
O.E. - drums

Reception
 Vampirefreaks  link	 	

2002 albums
The Birthday Massacre albums
Metropolis Records albums